NCBC may refer to:

National Campus Band Competition, Australian live band competition
National Centers for Biomedical Computing, U.S. NIH centers
National Commerce Bancorporation, a Memphis-based banking company later taken over by SunTrust Banks
National Commercial Bank (Saudi Arabia) and its investment arm NCB Capital
Neshaminy Creek Brewing Company, a brewery outside of Philadelphia, Pennsylvania, United States
New College Boat Club, a rowing club of New College, Oxford, England
Newnham College Boat Club, a rowing club of Newnham College, Cambridge, England
Nuclear cap-binding protein complex, RNA binding protein
National Commission for Backward Classes